Darian Allan George (born July 16, 1999) is an American football cornerback for the Cincinnati Bengals of the National Football League (NFL). He played college football at Vanderbilt.

Professional career
After going unselected in the 2022 NFL Draft, George was signed by the Cincinnati Bengals as an undrafted free agent. Although he initially made the Bengals' final roster, George was released on September 5. The following day, he was re-signed to the practice squad. He was elevated to the active roster on November 5, and made his NFL debut the following day against the Carolina Panthers. George was signed to the active roster on January 2, 2023.

References

External links
 Cincinnati Bengals bio
 Vanderbilt Commodores bio

1999 births
Living people
American football cornerbacks
Sportspeople from Alabama
Vanderbilt Commodores football players
Cincinnati Bengals players
People from Andalusia, Alabama